The 2020–21 Leicester City F.C. season was the club's 116th season in existence and the seventh consecutive season in the top flight of English football. In addition to the domestic league, Leicester City participated in the season's editions of the FA Cup, the EFL Cup and the UEFA Europa League. The season covers the period from 27 July 2020 to 30 June 2021.

Kits

Transfers

Transfers in

Loans in

Loans out

Transfers out

Pre-season and friendlies

Competitions

Overview

Premier League

League table

Results summary

Results by matchday

Matches
The league fixtures were announced on 20 August 2020.

FA Cup

The third round draw was made on 30 November, with Premier League and EFL Championship clubs all entering the competition. The fourth and fifth round draws were made consecutively on 11 January.

EFL Cup

The draw for both the second and third round were confirmed on 6 September, live on Sky Sports by Phil Babb.

UEFA Europa League

Group stage

The group stage draw was held on 2 October 2020.

Knockout phase

Round of 32
The draw for the round of 32 was held on 14 December 2020.

Squad statistics

Appearances
Italics indicate a loaned player

|-
|colspan="14"|Out on loan:

|-
|colspan="14"|No longer at the club:

|}

Goalscorers

Notes

References

External links

Leicester City F.C. seasons
Leicester City
Leicester City